Sir Kenneth Barnes, KCB (26 August 1922 – 16 September 2010) was an English civil servant. He attended Balliol College, Oxford, and served in the Second World War before entering the Ministry of Labour in 1948. After two years at the Cabinet Office (1966–68), he was deputy secretary at the Department of Employment, before serving as Permanent Secretary from 1976 to 1982. This was a difficult period, marred by industrial disputes, the Winter of Discontent and then some of the department's core functions being separated off into the Manpower Services Commission, the Health and Safety Commission and Advisory, Conciliation and Arbitration Service.

References 

1922 births
2010 deaths
English civil servants
Alumni of Balliol College, Oxford
Knights Companion of the Order of the Bath